The Xi'an Incident, previously romanized as the Sian Incident, was a political crisis that took place in Xi'an, Shaanxi in 1936. Chiang Kai-shek, leader of the Nationalist government of China, was detained by his subordinate generals Chang Hsüeh-liang (Zhang Xueliang) and Yang Hucheng, in order to force the ruling Chinese Nationalist Party (Kuomintang or KMT) to change its policies regarding the Empire of Japan and the Chinese Communist Party (CCP).

Prior to the incident, Chiang Kai-shek followed a strategy of "first internal pacification, then external resistance" that entailed eliminating the CCP and appeasing Japan to allow time for the modernization of China and its military. After the incident, Chiang aligned with the Communists against the Japanese. However, by the time Chiang arrived in Xi'an on 4 December 1936, negotiations for a united front had been in the works for two years. The crisis ended after two weeks of negotiation, in which Chiang was eventually released and returned to Nanjing, accompanied by Zhang. Chiang agreed to end the ongoing civil war against the CCP and began actively preparing for the impending war with Japan.

Background

Japanese invasion of Manchuria 

In 1931, the Empire of Japan escalated its aggression against China through the Mukden Incident. Japanese troops then occupied Northeast China. "Young Marshal" Chang Hsüeh-liang, who had succeeded his father as head of the Fengtian clique and Northeastern Army in that region, was widely criticized for this loss of territory. In response, Chang resigned from his position and went on a tour of Europe.

Nationalist-Communist conflicts 

In the aftermath of the Northern Expedition in 1928, China was nominally unified under the authority of the Nationalist government in Nanjing. Simultaneously, the Nationalist government violently purged members of the CCP in the Kuomintang, effectively ending the alliance between the two parties. Beginning in the 1930s, the Nationalist government launched a series of campaigns against the CCP.  In the meanwhile, the impending war against Japan led to nationwide unrest and surge of Chinese nationalism. Consequently, the campaigns against the Communist Party were becoming increasingly unpopular. Chiang, fearing the loss of Kuomintang leadership in China, continued the civil war against the CCP despite lacking popular support.

By late 1935 the Communists had narrowly avoided destruction on their Long March and had begun to establish themselves in a new base area on the border between Gansu and Ningxia provinces. They were besieged by a number of nationalist armies, including the Northwestern Army under Yang Hucheng and the Northeastern Army, to which Zhang Xueliang was re-assigned as commander after his return from a tour of Europe. The Nationalist armies initially gave no notice to the Communist exhortations for war against Japan, but this began to change because of the Red Army's "eastern expedition" from February to April 1936. The Communists declared that they were sending a detachment through Shanxi to fight the Japanese in Rehe and Hubei. Letting the Red Army through would have broken the encirclement, so Yan Xishan stopped them by force. Although defeated militarily, the Red Army had convinced the Shanxi peasantry of their patriotism and gained 8,000 new recruits on their retreat. Zhang Xueliang was likewise impressed and began to seem them as potential allies rather than foes. When Mao announced on March 14 that the Communists were willing to conclude a truce, Zhang covertly agreed. He proposed to Chiang Kai-shek that he reverse the Nationalist policy of prioritizing the purge of Communists, and instead focusing on military preparation against Japanese aggression. After Chiang refused, Zhang began to plot a coup in "great secrecy". By June 1936, the secret agreement between Zhang and the CCP had been successfully settled.

Events

In November 1936, Zhang told Chiang to come to Xi'an and talk to troops who did not want to fight the Communist forces any more. After Chiang agreed, Zhang informed Mao Zedong, who called the plan "a masterpiece". On 12 December 1936, bodyguards of Zhang Xueliang and Yang Hucheng stormed the cabin where Chiang was sleeping. Chiang was able to escape but suffered an injury in the process. He was eventually detained by Zhang's troops in the morning. A telegram was sent to Nanking (Nanjing) to demand immediate end to civil war against the CCP, and to reorganize the Nationalist government by expelling pro-Japanese factions and adopting an active anti-Japanese stance. As conflicting reports unfolded, the Nationalist government in Nanjing was sent into disarray.

Negotiations and release 
Many young officers in the Northeast Army demanded Chiang be killed. However, both Zhang and the Communists insisted that he be kept alive and that their intention was "only to change his policy". Had Chiang been killed, it would have ruined any chances of forming a united front against Japan. The responses to the coup from high-level Nationalist figures in Nanking were divided. The Military Affairs Commission led by He Yingqin recommended a military campaign against Xi'an, and immediately send a regiment to capture Tongguan. Soong Mei-ling and Kong Xiangxi were strongly in favor of negotiating a settlement to ensure the safety of Chiang.

On 16 December, Zhou Enlai and Lin Boqu arrived in Xi'an to represent the CCP in negotiations. At first, Chiang was opposed to negotiating with a CCP delegate, but withdrew his opposition when it became clear that his life and freedom were largely dependent on Communist goodwill towards him. Influencing his decision was also the arrival of Madame Chiang on 22 December, who had travelled to Xi'an hoping to secure his speedy release, fearing military intervention from factions within the Kuomintang. On 24 December, Chiang received Zhou for a meeting, the first time that the two had seen each other since Zhou had left Whampoa Military Academy over ten years earlier. Zhou began the conversation by saying: "In the ten years since we have met, you seem to have aged very little." Chiang nodded and said: "Enlai, you were my subordinate. You should do what I say." Zhou replied that if Chiang would halt the civil war and resist the Japanese instead, the Red Army would willingly accept Chiang's command. By the end of the meeting, Chiang promised to end the civil war, to resist the Japanese together, and to invite Zhou to Nanjing for further talks.

Aftermath 

The Xi'an Incident was a turning point for the CCP. Chiang's leadership over political and military affairs in China was affirmed, while the CCP was able to expand its own strength under the new united front, which later played a factor in the Chinese Communist Revolution.

Yang was imprisoned and eventually executed on the order of Chiang Kai-shek in 1949, before the Nationalist retreat to Taiwan.

References

Sources

 
 
 
 
 
 
 
 

Chinese Civil War
History of Xi'an
1936 in China